Flat Creek may refer to:

Places
 Flat Creek, Idaho, U.S.
 Flat Creek, North Carolina, U.S.
 Flat Creek, Tennessee, U.S.
 Flat Creek, Prince Edward Island, Canada
 Flat Creek, a community in Yukon, Canada
 Flat Creek Ranch, Jackson Hole, Wyoming, U.S.
 Flat Creek Township, Barry County, Missouri, U.S.
 Flat Creek Township, Pettis County, Missouri, U.S.

Rivers and streams

Georgia 
 Flat Creek (Chattahoochee River), a stream in Georgia, U.S.
 Flat Creek (Lake Lanier), a stream in Georgia, U.S.
 Flat Creek, a tributary of the Ocmulgee River, Georgia, U.S.

Missouri 
 Flat Creek (Bourbeuse River), a stream in Missouri, U.S.
 Flat Creek (James River), a stream in Missouri, U.S.
 Flat Creek (Lamine River), a stream in Missouri, U.S.
 Flat Creek (Little Black River), a stream in Missouri, U.S.
 Flat Creek (Meramec River), a stream in Missouri, U.S.
 Flat Creek (Middle Fork Salt River), a stream in Missouri, U.S.

New York 
 Flat Creek (Mohawk River tributary), a stream in New York, U.S.

North Carolina 
 Flat Creek (Swannanoa River tributary), a stream in Buncombe County, North Carolina, U.S.
 Flat Creek (Little River tributary), a stream in Hoke County, North Carolina, U.S.
 Flat Creek (Deep River tributary), a stream in Randolph County, North Carolina, U.S.

Virginia 
 Flat Creek (Virginia), U.S.
 Flat Creek (Stewarts Creek tributary), a stream in Carroll County, Virginia

Washington, D.C. 
 Flat Creek (Columbia River), a stream in Washington, U.S.

Wyoming 
 Flat Creek (Snake River), a tributary of the Snake River, Wyoming, U.S.

See also